Corey James Gameiro (born 7 February 1993) is an Australian football player of Portuguese ancestry who most recently played as a forward for A-League club Central Coast Mariners.

Club career

Fulham
Gameiro signed a professional contract with Fulham in August 2009 and he signed a contract extension in May 2012 that saw him remain at Fulham until the summer 2013.

He was one of 12 players released by Fulham at the end of the 2012–13 Premier League season.

Loan to Hayes & Yeading United
Gameiro was loaned out to Hayes & Yeading for one month on 24 November 2011

Loan to Eindhoven
The following season, he joined FC Eindhoven on a four-month loan on 31 August 2012. The same day he made his professional debut in the Eerste Divisie, in a match against FC Volendam, coming of the bench in the 64th minute.

Loan to Wellington Phoenix
Gameiro joined Wellington Phoenix on a loan deal until the end of the 2012-13 A-League season on 9 February 2013.

Sydney FC
On 28 June 2013, Gameiro signed for A-League team Sydney FC on a two-year deal.

On 3 January 2014, Gameiro scored his first goal for Sydney FC, scoring against Adelaide United with a header from a Nikola Petković free kick.

Gameiro was released by Sydney FC following the 2014–15 A-League season. He rejected Sydney's contract in order to find another team.

Melbourne City
On 22 June 2015, Melbourne City announced they had recruited Gameiro on a 2-year deal despite injury concerns.

On 1 May 2017, Melbourne City announced Gameiro would not be offered a new contract and effectively released him from the club. Gameiro was injured for the bulk of his time at Melbourne City and played only a handful of games for the club.

Brisbane Roar
On 4 July 2017, Gamerio joined Brisbane Roar. and played his first game making his debut in a 2–0 preseason win over Sydney F.C. on 16 September 2017. Gameiro announced his delight at returning to football after 22 months saying “He [John Aloisi] was the one who put his hand out to me when I needed it. I really am so thankful and I won’t ever let him down because he didn’t let me down in my time of need". On 3 May 2018, Gameiro had his contract terminated by mutual consent by Brisbane Roar.

Central Coast Mariners
Following his release from Brisbane Roar, Gameiro signed a one-year deal with Central Coast Mariners on 8 May 2018. He was released by the club on 22 May 2019 and did not feature in a competitive match for the Mariners.

International career
Gameiro scored a hat-trick during the 2012 AFC U-19 Championship match against Jordan, securing a place at the U20 World Cup to be held in Turkey in June 2013.

Club statistics

Honours

Distinctions
 First FFA Cup goal Scorer: (Sydney FC v Melbourne City FC – 12 August 2014)

References

External links

1993 births
Australian soccer players
Australian people of Portuguese descent
Australian expatriate sportspeople in England
Association football forwards
Wollongong Wolves FC players
Sydney FC players
Hayes & Yeading United F.C. players
Fulham F.C. players
FC Eindhoven players
Eerste Divisie players
Wellington Phoenix FC players
Melbourne City FC players
Brisbane Roar FC players
Central Coast Mariners FC players
APIA Leichhardt FC players
A-League Men players
National League (English football) players
Living people
People from the Illawarra
Sportsmen from New South Wales
Soccer players from New South Wales